The 2016 200 km of Buenos Aires was the seventh edition of this race in the TC2000 season. The race was held in the Autódromo Juan y Óscar Gálvez in Buenos Aires.

Report

Race Results

References 

Buenos Aires 200km
Buenos Aires